Aanaahad (born 29 November 1982) is an Indian actor who appears in Bollywood movies. He first appeared in the 2010 film Lahore, for which he won award for Best Actor at Salento International Film Festival, 2009 and Tenerife International Film Festival, 2009.

Career 

Aanaahad made his acting debut in March 2010 with Lahore. He stated: "I did not choose Lahore, the film chose me." The film won accolades at international forums.

Upcoming projects 
Aanaahad is said to be training for a superhero film under the guidance of Hollywood action director Tony Leung.

Awards and nominations

International awards
Winner
 2009 - Best Actor at Salento International Film Festival, Italy for Lahore
 2009 - Best Actor at Tenerife International Film Festival, UK for Lahore

Nominated
 2009 - Best Actor at Asian Festival of 1st Films, Singapore for Lahore

Filmography

References

External links 

 
 Lahore Review - Indiatimes.com
 Lahore's been a prefect launch : Aanaahad
 Interview : Aanaahad
 The film chose me
 'Acting Is Not As Easy As Everyone Makes It Out To Be
 I waited for a long time to get a film like Lahore because I did not want to make my debut as an actor with a run of the mill film – Aanaahad
 Aanaahad didn't have time to look good!
 Punch Factor: Aanaahad Kicks Up Acclaim
 What I took back from the film is a son. Aanaahad still calls me amma. - Nafisa Ali

21st-century Indian male actors
Indian male film actors
Living people
Male actors from Mumbai
Male actors in Hindi cinema
1982 births